Richard Courtland Horne (September 4, 1918 – November 1964) was an American football end.

Horne was born in Denver, Colorado in 1918 and attended Woodrow Wilson Classical High School in Long Beach, California.  He played college football for Oregon in 1939 and 1940. He won the Hoffman Award as Oregon's outstanding senior football player in 1940.

He played professional football in the National Football League for the New York Giants in 1941 and in the All-America Football Conference for the Miami Seahawks in 1946 and the San Francisco 49ers in 1947.  He appeared in a total of 22 professional games, five of them as a starter, and caught eight passes for 117 yards. 

He died in 1964.

References

1918 births
1964 deaths
American football ends
New York Giants players
Miami Seahawks players
San Francisco 49ers players
Oregon Ducks football players
Players of American football from Denver